Tora Øyna (31 March 1898 – 5 February 1991) was a Norwegian politician for the Centre Party.

She served as a deputy representative to the Norwegian Parliament from Vest-Agder during the terms 1958–1961 and 1961–1965.

References

1898 births
1991 deaths
Centre Party (Norway) politicians
Deputy members of the Storting
Vest-Agder politicians
Women members of the Storting
20th-century Norwegian women politicians
20th-century Norwegian politicians